Aaron Black(e) is the name of:

Aaron Black (basketball) (born 1996), Filipino-American basketball player
Aaron Black (footballer, born 1990), Australian rules footballer for Geelong, North Melbourne and Peel
Aaron Black (footballer, born 1992), Australian rules footballer for West Perth
Aaron Black (Irish footballer) (born 1983), Association footballer from Northern Ireland
Aaron Black, singer with Capitol Offense (band)
Aaron Black (golfer) in Carolinas Open
Aaron Blacke, unofficial Mayor of Invercargill